Thomas Griesser (born 4 March 1967) is an Austrian sprinter. He competed in the men's 200 metres at the 1996 Summer Olympics.

References

1967 births
Living people
Athletes (track and field) at the 1996 Summer Olympics
Austrian male sprinters
Olympic athletes of Austria
Place of birth missing (living people)